In the United States, a backcountry is a geographical area that is remote or difficult to access.

Backcountry or Back Country may also refer to:

 Backcountry (historical region), in 18th-century North America, the area west of the Appalachians
 Backcountry (film), a 2014 Canadian film
 Backcountry.com an online retailer of outdoor clothing and equipment
 Backcountry skiing, skiing in wilderness areas
 Backcountry Super Cubs, an American aircraft manufacturer
 Back Country, a 2007 album by Five for Fighting

See also
 Frontier
 Outback